Wave Dragon is a floating slack-moored energy converter of the overtopping type, developed by the Danish company Wave Dragon Aps. Wave Dragon is a joint EU research project, including partners from Austria, Denmark, Germany, Ireland, Portugal, Sweden, and the UK. It was the world's first offshore wave energy converter.

History
The 237 ton prototype Wave Dragon was towed in March 2003 to the first test site at the Danish Wave Energy Test Center in Nissum Bredning fjord. It was tested until January 2005. In 2006 a modified prototype was deployed to another test site with more energetic wave climate. The prototype was scrapped in 2011.

Technology

Wave Dragon is a floating, slack-moored energy converter of the 'overtopping' type which can be deployed as a single unit, or in arrays of up to 200 units; the output of such an array would have a capacity comparable to traditional fossil-fuel power plants.

The first prototype was connected to the power grid in 2003 and is currently deployed in Nissum Bredning, Denmark. Long term testing is under way to determine system performance; i.e. availability and power production under different weather and tide conditions. A multi-MW deployment is expected in 2009.

The Wave Dragon concept combines existing, mature offshore and hydro turbine technology. In the Wave Dragon, the Kaplan turbine is being tested at the Technical University of Munich. This turbine uses a siphon inlet whereas the next 6 turbines to be installed will be equipped with a cylinder gate to start and stop water inlet to the turbine.

Principles

Construction

Wave Dragon uses principles from traditional hydropower plants in an offshore floating platform to use wave energy.

The Wave Dragon consists of two wave reflectors that direct the waves towards a ramp.  Behind the ramp, a large reservoir collects the directed water, and temporarily stores the water. The reservoir is held above sea level. The water leaves the reservoir through hydro turbines.

Three-step energy conversion:

Overtopping (absorption) -> Storage (reservoir) -> Power-take-off (low-head turbines)

Main components of a Wave Dragon:
Main body with a double curved ramp (reinforced concrete and/or steel construction)
Two wave reflectors in reinforced concrete and/or steel
Mooring system
Propeller turbines
Permanent Magnet Generators

Design

Wave energy converters make use of the mechanical motion or fluid pressure. Wave Dragon does not have any conversion, e.g. oscillating water/air columns, hinged rafts, and gyroscopic/hydraulic devices. The Wave Dragon directly utilises the energy of the water's motion.

The Wave Dragon is of heavy, durable construction and has only one kind of moving parts: the turbines. This is essential for any device bound for operations offshore, where extreme conditions and  fouling, etc., seriously affect any moving parts.

Wave Dragon model testing has been used in order to:
Optimize 'overtopping'
Refine hydraulic response: anti-pitching and anti-rolling.
Reduce stress on wave reflectors and the mooring system, etc.
 Reduce construction costs, maintenance and running costs.

Main body
The main body to or platform consists of one large floating reservoir. To reduce rolling and keep the platform stable, the Wave Dragon must be large and heavy.  The prototype used in Nissum is of a traditional (ship-like) plate construction of plates of 8 mm steel. The total steel weight of the main body plus the ramp is 150 tons, so that 87 tons of water must be added to  achieve the 237 tons total weight needed for stable continuous operation.

See also

Wave power

References

External links
Wave Dragon - official website
http://www.guardian.co.uk/science/2004/mar/21/energy.renewableenergy

Wave energy converters
Wave farms in Denmark